Meganola minuscula, the confused meganola, is a nolid moth (family Nolidae). The species was first described by Philipp Christoph Zeller in 1872. It is found in North America.

The MONA or Hodges number for Meganola minuscula is 8983.

References

Further reading

External links
 

Nolinae
Articles created by Qbugbot
Moths described in 1872